Rit'i Apachita (Quechua, rit'i snow, Aymara and Quechua apachita the place of transit of an important pass in the principal routes of the Andes; name in the Andes for a stone cairn, a little pile of rocks built along the trail in the high mountains, Hispanicized spelling Riti Apacheta) is a  mountain in the Apolobamba mountain range in Bolivia. It is situated in the La Paz Department, Franz Tamayo Province, Pelechuco Municipality, north-west of Pelechuco. Rit'i Apachita lies northeast of the mountain Sural (Soral) and southeast of the mountain Apachita Pura Pura.

There is a little lake east of the mountain named Q'illuqucha (Quechua for "yellow lake",  Quellucocha).

References 

Mountains of La Paz Department (Bolivia)